Chris Julian may refer to:
 Chris Julian (producer) (born 1957), American film and music producer
 Chris Julian (speedway rider) (1947–1997), British speedway rider
 Chris Julian (designer), philanthropist and retail entrepreneur